Roger David Smith (born 26 May 1960) is a former field hockey player from Australia, who competed in the 1988 Summer Olympics for his native country. He was a member of the Australia men's national field hockey team, best known as the Kookaburras.

Personal
Roger lives in South Australia. He has been involved with the business Hockeyworld along with older brothers Trevor Smith (field hockey) and Terry Smith who also played hockey for Australia.

Field hockey

International hockey
He made his Olympic Games debut in 1988 in Seoul where the Kookaburras finished fourth.

He played in the same team as Ric Charlesworth and Graham Reid (sportsman) who would go on to coach the national teams themselves.

References

External links
 

1960 births
Living people
Australian male field hockey players
Place of birth missing (living people)
Olympic field hockey players of Australia
Field hockey players at the 1988 Summer Olympics